Weigall is a surname. Notable people with the surname include: 

 Albert Bythesea Weigall (1840–1912), English -born Australian schoolmaster
 Archibald Weigall (1874–1952), British Conservative politician
 Arthur Weigall (1880–1934), English Egyptologist
 Evelyn Weigall, English cricketer
 Gerry Weigall (1870–1944), English cricketer
 Henry Weigall (1829–1925), English Victorian painter
 Henry Weigall (1800–1883), English sculptor (father of the painter above)
 Louis Weigall (1873–1957), English cricketer